Carlos Daniel Silveira da Graça (born 5 January 1988), known as Kay, is a Cape Verdean professional footballer who plays as a centre back.

Club career

Portugal
Born in Nossa Senhora da Luz (São Vicente), Kay spent the first seven years of his senior career in Portugal, also playing youth football in the country with S.L. Benfica and Académica de Coimbra. He competed in lower league or amateur football until the age of 24, representing G.D. Tourizense, Grupo Desportivo Tabuense, S.C. Mineiro Aljustrelense and CD Operário.

In early 2012, Kay agreed to a contract with Segunda Liga club C.F. Belenenses effective as of 1 July. He contributed with 35 games and five goals in his first season, helping to a return to the Primeira Liga after a three-year absence.

Kay made his debut in the Portuguese top division on 26 August 2013, playing the full 90 minutes in a 1–2 away loss against S.C. Braga.

Universitatea Craiova
In June 2014, Kay signed with CS Universitatea Craiova in the Romanian Liga I. His maiden appearance in the competition took place on 25 July, in a 1–1 home draw against CS Pandurii Târgu Jiu.

In the 2015–16 season, Kay scored once in 21 matches to help his team finish in eighth position. His teammates included countrymen Rambé and Nuno Rocha, and he was released from contract on 1 April 2017.

Later years
On 26 June 2017, Kay joined AC Omonia on a two-year deal. On 9 July 2019, he moved to Liga II club FC Universitatea Cluj from FK Senica of the Slovak Super Liga.

International career
Kay earned his first cap for Cape Verde on 8 June 2013, in a 2–1 home win over Equatorial Guinea for the 2014 FIFA World Cup qualifiers (later awarded 3–0). Selected for the 2015 Africa Cup of Nations finals by manager Rui Águas, he was an unused squad member in an eventual group stage exit.

Kay scored his first goal for the Blue Sharks on 6 September 2015, helping to a 2–1 success in Libya for the 2017 Africa Cup of Nations qualifying phase.

International goals
 (Cape Verde score listed first, score column indicates score after each Kay goal)

References

External links

1988 births
Living people
Cape Verdean footballers
Association football defenders
People from São Vicente, Cape Verde
Batuque FC players
Primeira Liga players
Liga Portugal 2 players
Segunda Divisão players
G.D. Tourizense players
C.F. Os Belenenses players
Liga I players
Liga II players
CS Universitatea Craiova players
FC Universitatea Cluj players
AC Omonia players
Slovak Super Liga players
FK Senica players
Cape Verde international footballers
2015 Africa Cup of Nations players
Cape Verdean expatriate footballers
Expatriate footballers in Portugal
Expatriate footballers in Romania
Expatriate footballers in Cyprus
Expatriate footballers in Slovakia
Cape Verdean expatriate sportspeople in Portugal
Cape Verdean expatriate sportspeople in Romania
Cape Verdean expatriate sportspeople in Cyprus
Cape Verdean expatriate sportspeople in Slovakia